Cephetola gerdae is a butterfly in the family Lycaenidae. It is found in Tanzania.

References

Butterflies described in 1998
Poritiinae